The tenth season of the long-running Australian medical drama All Saints began airing on 13 February 2007 and concluded on 20 November 2007 with a total of 41 episodes.

Plot 
With the team still reeling from the shooting of Bart  West it's all hands to the pump to save his life as well as keep the Emergency Department operating at full steam. The team show strengths they didn't know they had, forge new friendships and relationships that both tantalise and shock us, and re-establish themselves as the best ED staff in the country.

Season 10 also sees two of the team leave, one in tragic circumstances - Sean Everleigh - the other to the promise of love - Vincent Hughes. We celebrate the birth of Charlotte Beaumont's baby Zachary, see the return of Cate McMasters from a drug overdose and take the emotional journey with Jack Quade as he deals with a dark secret. There will be two romances to delight in - Dan Goldman and Erica Templeton - and new friendships to explore - Zoe Gallagher and nurse Gabrielle Jaeger. And all of this will continue to play out under the Captaincy of Frank Campion.

Cast

Main cast 
 John Howard as Frank Campion
 Alexandra Davies as Cate McMasters
 Tammy Macintosh as Charlotte Beaumont
 Christopher Gabardi as Vincent Hughes (until episode 21)
 Judith McGrath as Von Ryan
 Mark Priestley as Dan Goldman
 Wil Traval as Jack Quade
 Chris Vance as Sean Everleigh (until episode 18)
 Jolene Anderson as Erica Templeton
 Allison Cratchley as Zoe Gallagher
 Andrew Supanz as Bartholomew West
 Virginia Gay as Gabrielle Jaeger
 Jack Campbell as Steve Taylor (from episode 26)
 John Waters as Mike Vlasek (from episode 4)

Recurring cast 
 Mike Smith as Heath Velaga (26 episodes)
 Celeste Barber as Bree Matthews (17 episodes)
 Alexandra Fowler as Eve Ballantyne (9 episodes)
 Wendy Strehlow as Lorraine Tanner (7 episodes)
 Yael Stone as Ann-Maree Preston (7 episodes)
 Rebecca Ritters as Rachel Simms (6 episodes)
 Pip Miller as Patrick Wesley (5 episodes)
 Anthony Gee as Travis Knight (5 episodes)
 Will Snow as Simon McDermott (5 episodes)

Guest cast 
 Tracy Mann as Laura McDermott (3 episodes)
 Nathaniel Dean as James Byrne (3 episodes)
 Sonia Todd as Elizabeth Foy (2 episodes)
 Peter Phelps as Doug Spencer (1 episode)
 Peta Sergeant as Bianca Frost (1 episode)
 Jay Gallagher as AJ Templeton (1 episode)
 Frank Gallacher as Bruce Campion (1 episode)
 Karen Cobban as Therese McMasters (1 episode)

Episodes

References

General
 Zuk, T. All Saints Series 10 episode guide, Australian Television Information Archive. Retrieved 15 July 2008.
 TV.com editors. All Saints Episode Guide - Season 10, TV.com. Retrieved 15 July 2008.
Specific

All Saints (TV series) seasons
2007 Australian television seasons